Cynthia Erivo (born 8 January 1987) is an English actress, singer, and songwriter. She is the recipient of several accolades, including a Grammy Award and a Tony Award, in addition to nominations for two Academy Awards and a Primetime Emmy Award.

Erivo began acting in a 2011 stage production of The Umbrellas of Cherbourg. She gained recognition for starring in the Broadway revival of The Color Purple from 2015 to 2017, for which she won the 2016 Tony Award for Best Actress in a Musical and the Grammy Award for Best Musical Theater Album. Erivo ventured into films in 2018, playing roles in the heist film Widows and the thriller Bad Times at the El Royale. For her portrayal of American abolitionist Harriet Tubman in the biopic Harriet (2019), Erivo received a nomination for the Academy Award for Best Actress; she also wrote and performed the song "Stand Up" on its soundtrack, which garnered her a nomination in the Best Original Song category.

On television, Erivo had her first role in the British series Chewing Gum (2015). She went on to star in the crime drama miniseries The Outsider (2020), and received a nomination for a Primetime Emmy Award for Outstanding Lead Actress for her portrayal of American singer Aretha Franklin in National Geographic's anthology series Genius: Aretha (2021).

Early life and education
Erivo was born to Nigerian parents in Stockwell, South London. Her mother is a nurse. She attended La Retraite Roman Catholic Girls' School. Erivo began a music psychology degree at the University of East London; however, a year into her degree, she applied to, and subsequently trained at, the Royal Academy of Dramatic Art.

Career

Career beginnings and theatrical roles (2011–2017)
Erivo first appeared in roles on British television programmes such as Chewing Gum and The Tunnel. Her first stage role was in Marine Parade by Simon Stephens at the Brighton Festival. Her first musical role was in John Adams' and June Jordan's I Was Looking at the Ceiling and Then I Saw the Sky at Theatre Royal Stratford East.

In 2013, Erivo played the role of Celie Harris in the Menier Chocolate Factory production of The Color Purple, a role which Whoopi Goldberg had originated onscreen. Erivo had previously portrayed Sister Mary Clarence / Deloris Van Cartier in a UK tour of the stage musical Sister Act, which Goldberg had originated in its film adaptation. She is also featured on the soundtrack to the musical drama film Beyond the Lights, co-writing and performing the song "Fly Before You Fall".

Erivo originated the role of Chenice in the West End musical I Can't Sing!, which opened at the London Palladium on 26 March 2014, garnering mixed reviews. The production closed on 10 May, just six weeks and three days after its official opening night. Erivo starred in the European premiere of Dessa Rose at London's Trafalgar Studios from July to August 2014, for which she was nominated as Best Leading Actress in a musical at the 2015 BroadwayWorld UK awards.

She made her Broadway debut in the 2015 Broadway revival transfer of the Menier Chocolate Factory production of The Color Purple, reprising her role as Celie Harris alongside American actresses Jennifer Hudson as Shug Avery and Danielle Brooks as Sofia. The production began performances at Bernard B. Jacobs Theatre, from 10 December 2015. Among other awards for her performance, Erivo won the 2016 Tony Award for Best Actress in a Musical.

Erivo starred as Cathy alongside Joshua Henry in a one-night benefit concert performance of Jason Robert Brown's The Last Five Years on 12 September 2016. Proceeds from the performance went to the Brady Center, a national gun violence organization. In February 2017, Erivo performed "God Only Knows" as a tribute to musicians who had died over the past year alongside John Legend at the 59th Annual Grammy Awards.

In March 2017, Erivo and the cast of The Color Purple were nominated for a Daytime Emmy Award for their performance on NBC's The Today Show in May 2016. In April 2017, it was announced that Erivo and the cast of The Color Purple alongside The Today Show won the Daytime Creative Arts Emmy Award in the Outstanding Musical Performance in a Daytime Program category. In November 2017, she appeared on the charity benefit Night of Too Many Stars, hosted by Jon Stewart, where she performed a duet with frequent contributor Jodi DiPiazza of the Andra Day hit "Rise Up" they were accompanied by Questlove and The Roots.

Film career (since 2018)

Erivo made her film debut in 2018 in the neo-noir thriller film Bad Times at the El Royale. Justin Chang of the Los Angeles Times deemed Erivo's performance "revelatory in the most rewarding sense". That same year, she also starred in the heist thriller film Widows, which marked the first film she had ever shot. In his review of the film for The Atlantic, David Sims highlighted Erivo's "incredible work" in portraying her character's dramatic transformation. In 2019, Erivo produced and starred in the scripted science fiction thriller podcast Carrier, voicing the lead role of Raylene Watts, a long-haul truck driver transporting a trailer with "disturbing, mysterious contents".

Erivo portrayed the title role in Harriet, a biographical film about American abolitionist Harriet Tubman. The film began production in October 2018, completed filming in January 2019, and was released on 1 November 2019. Her performance earned her a nomination for the Golden Globe Award for Best Actress in a Motion Picture – Drama; she also received a second nomination for Best Original Song for a song she co-wrote and performed for the film entitled "Stand Up". In 2020, Erivo garnered nominations for two Academy Awards–one for Best Actress for her portrayal of Tubman and the other for Best Original Song for "Stand Up".

In 2020, Erivo starred as investigator Holly Gibney in the HBO miniseries The Outsider, a television adaptation of Stephen King's novel of the same name. That same year, she launched a production company named Edith's Daughter as well as signed a deal with media company MRC to develop television projects through the production company. She appeared in the science fiction film Chaos Walking, based on Patrick Ness' novel The Knife of Never Letting Go, which was released on 5 March 2021. Erivo portrayed singer Aretha Franklin in the third season of the anthology series Genius, which premiered in March 2021. She released two songs titled "The Good" and "Glowing Up" to promote her debut studio album, Ch. 1 Vs. 1, which was released on 7 September 2021. That same month, she joined the jury of the 78th Venice International Film Festival.

Erivo played The Blue Fairy in Disney's live-action film adaptation of Pinocchio, directed by Robert Zemeckis. She is slated to produce and star in a film adaption of the podcast Carrier, reprising the role of Raylene. Erivo is attached to star in a film continuation of the series Luther and as Elphaba in a two-part film adaptation of the musical Wicked. She will star in and produce sci-fi film Blink Speed for Netflix.

BBC Proms 2022
On 17 July 2022 Enviro performed at the BBC Proms, offering a tribute to those legendary singers who have inspired, such as Nina Simone, Shirley Bassey, Billie Holiday and Gladys Knight. Writing in The Times, John Bungey said "... Erivo's homage to 'Legendary Voices' amounted to much more than a night of reverent fangirl covers. Once you accepted the terms of engagement, there was plenty to enjoy — foremost Erivo's magnificent singing. In classical terms she is a mezzo-soprano with a three-octave range, and while she sometimes improvised soulful embellishments, all was in service of the song. Her a cappella opening to "The First Time Ever I Saw Your Face" was so pure it was almost a shame when the orchestra crept in. By contrast, her voice took on an urgent bluesy power for Franklin's "Ain't No Way", a funky highlight."

Personal life
Erivo is Roman Catholic.  Erivo identifies as queer and bisexual.

Filmography

Film

Television

Podcasts

Theatre credits

Discography

Albums

Solo studio albums

Collaborative studio albums

Extended plays

Singles

As lead artist

As featured artist

Other charted songs

Other appearances

Accolades

References

External links

 
 
 

1987 births
Living people
Black British actresses
21st-century Black British women singers
Actresses from London
People from Stockwell
English Roman Catholics
Singers from London
Grammy Award winners
Tony Award winners
Daytime Emmy Award winners
Alumni of the University of East London
Alumni of RADA
English people of Nigerian descent
21st-century British actresses
Theatre World Award winners
Bisexual actresses
Bisexual women
British bisexual people
British LGBT actors
LGBT Black British people
LGBT Roman Catholics
Queer women 
Queer actresses‎